WP or wp may refer to:

Organisations
 Warsaw Pact, a disbanded organization of Central and Eastern European communist states
 , the Reich Party of the German Middle Class, a political party of Weimar Germany
 , the Polish Armed Forces
 Workers' Party (Singapore), a political party
 Workers Party (United States), a defunct political party

Science and technology
 Watt-peak (Wp), the nominal power of a photovoltaic
 Wilting point, in soil moisture determination

Computing
 Weakest precondition (wp), in computer science
 Windows Phone, a smartphone operating system
 WordPerfect, a word processor
 Word processor, software used for the production of printable material
 WordPress (wp.org), a content management system

Websites
 Wikipedia, an online encyclopedia
 Wirtualna Polska, a Polish web portal
 WordPress.com, a blog hosting provider powered by WordPress

Transportation
 Indian locomotive class WP
 Western Pacific Railroad (reporting mark), a former American railroad
 Island Air (Hawaii) (IATA code), an airline

Other uses
 WP (Polish TV channel), a television channel owned by Wirtualna Polska Holding
 White phosphorus munitions
 Widening participation, in higher education
 Wild pitch, in baseball
 Work Programme, a UK welfare to work scheme
 Wettable powder, a powder
 Western Province (rugby union), a South African professional rugby union team nickname WP

See also
 The Washington Post (WaPo), an American newspaper